This was the first edition of the tournament. Tamarine Tanasugarn was the top seed, but she lost in the quarterfinals.

Rika Fujiwara won the title, defeating Bojana Jovanovski in the final, 5–7, 6–4, 6–3.

Seeds 

  Tamarine Tanasugarn (quarterfinals)
  Maša Zec Peškirič (second round)
  Bojana Jovanovski (final)
  Ksenia Palkina (first round)
  Nina Bratchikova (semifinals)
  Rika Fujiwara (champion)
  N/A
  Anastasiya Vasylyeva (quarterfinals)

Main draw

Finals

Top half

Bottom half

References 
 Main draw

2009 ITF Women's Circuit
NECC–ITF Women's Tennis Championships
NEEC